The Shitotsubakurai lunge mine was a suicidal anti-tank weapon developed and used by the Empire of Japan during the Second World War. It used a HEAT type charge. This weapon was used by the CQC units of the Imperial Japanese Army. The weapon itself was a conical hollow charge anti-tank mine, placed inside a metallic container and attached to the end of a wooden stick. The weapon was officially adopted by the Japanese Army in 1945; in that year it caused its first victims in the Pacific Theater, where it commonly saw action against American armour. Later that year, some Japanese Imperial Army manuals of the weapon were discovered by US troops.

Design 
The weapon itself was a conical hollow charge attached to one end of the weapon, which was a wooden stick used to hold the weapon during its transport and use. The mine had three equally spaced legs facing forward around the conical explosive base of the weapon. The detonator of the weapon was situated at the end of the conical base. The handle was connected to the mine body with a length of tubing through which it could slide once the safety pin was removed and the copper shear wire broken by impact with the target, at which point the steel striker at its end would be driven into the detonator.

Operation
To use the mine, the soldier would remove the security pin, then run towards the enemy armoured vehicle as if making a bayonet charge, and thrust the top of the mine against the target. The weapon needed to be held by the center with the left hand and by the bottom with the other hand. When the legs of the mine hit the objective, the handle was pushed forward, cutting a pin and making the striker move forward to the detonator. This would set off the mine, blowing up its user and, presumably, the targeted enemy armour.

Armour penetration
However, the mine would almost always impact at 90º should an attack be successful, thanks to the fine control of the impact angle afforded by direct, manual handling of the weapon.

Combat record
The weapon was used by the Imperial Japanese Army during the later stages of the Second World War in the Pacific Theater against American armour.

The Intelligence Bulletin reported in March 1945 that United States forces met this weapon for the first time in Leyte Island, The Philippines, during the 1944 invasion. It also reported that "To date all attempts by the enemy to use the Lunge Mine against our tanks have met with failure" and rates it as "Perhaps the oddest of these antitank charges."

In Vietnam, it became an icon of the First Indochina War, specifically the Battle of Hanoi, during which Battalion Commander Nguyen Van Thieng tried to use it; however, "the bombs failed to explode. In the end, he was shot and heroically sacrificed."

Gallery

References

9
Anti-tank weapons
Anti-tank mines
Japanese inventions
Weapons and ammunition introduced in 1944
World War II suicide weapons of Japan